Jaime "Jim" Ayala (born May 24, 1962) is a social entrepreneur based in Manila, Philippines. He founded the Hybrid Network, a cluster of social businesses that pioneered the "hybrid value chain" concept. Before he became a social entrepreneur, he had a long career in business, as a consultant for McKinsey & Company and CEO of Ayala Land, a publicly listed company. Ayala was recognized by Ernst & Young as the 2012 Entrepreneur of the Year and the 2012 Social Entrepreneur of the Year for the Philippines. In 2013, he was named as one of the Schwab Foundation for Social Entrepreneurship's 24 World Social Entrepreneurs of the Year.

Early life and education 
Ayala was born in the Philippines as the second out of five children. His mother, a member of the Imperial clan in Naga, had a master's degree in English. His father grew up in Manila and worked in government, as the chairman of the BOI. Ayala's father died when Jim was 14. His late father's final bidding, to get a good education, take care of their mother, and return to the Philippines to help in its development, has been important motivation in Ayala's family life and career. Ayala attended Ateneo de Manila University before continuing his education in the United States.

Ayala graduated magna cum laude from Princeton University in 1984, earning a Bachelor of Arts in Economics. In 1988, he graduated with honors from Harvard Business School, where he received his master's degree in Business Administration.

Corporate career

McKinsey & Company 
Ayala was a Director (Global Senior Partner) for McKinsey & Company, the world's leading top-management consulting firm. During his 19-year career at McKinsey, Ayala worked in 29 countries, focusing on development work in emerging markets. He helped open nine offices in China and Southeast Asia and was the head of the firm's Asian Energy Practice. Ayala is the only Filipino to have been elected to McKinsey's global partnership.

Ayala Land 
In 2004, Ayala left McKinsey to become the President and CEO of Ayala Land, the largest property developer in the Philippines. Jim Ayala is not related to the Zobel de Ayala family that controls the developer. During Jim Ayala's five years as CEO, Ayala Land experienced a 130% growth in revenue and an 80% growth in earnings. Ayala Land also launched the cities of Bonifacio Global City in Taguig and Nuvali in Santa Rosa under his leadership. During this time, Jim Ayala was added to the Ayala Foundation Board of Trustees. In 2009, he became the Senior Managing Director of Ayala Corporation.

Social entrepreneurship 
Ayala lived in the Philippines, a country plagued by widespread poverty, for a significant portion of his life. After working in the corporate world for several decades he began to question why he was not spending his energy helping people who need the most help. Ayala realized that most businesses neglect the poorest one-third of humanity. He was quoted in Business World Magazine as saying, "We have to work with the citizens of this country to empower them; they need access to basic things. They need access to food, electricity, health care, clean water." In an effort to empower poor, remote communities throughout the Philippines, Ayala left the corporate world in 2010 to found the Hybrid Network, a cluster of social businesses focused on working together to engage market and philanthropic forces in "hybrid value chains."

Hybrid Social Solutions, Inc. 
In June 2010, Ayala founded the award-winning social enterprise, Hybrid Social Solutions (HSSi). HSSi seeks to provide Filipinos in need with access to high-quality and affordable products and training services necessary for development. HSSi primarily distributes a large selection of durable, warranty-protected solar-powered lights with cell phone charging capabilities, in order to provide a source of light and communication to off-grid communities. HSSi partners with socially-oriented organizations on the ground in rural areas in order to distribute their products to rural communities, schools, and health units in the Philippines. HSSi is able to provide financing for buyers in need by partnering with microfinance institutions and cooperatives. According to a Planete d'Entrepreneur Social Impact Assessment, 97% of HSSi's customers said it was not difficult to pay back their loan every week. Kerosene consumption decreased by over 81% among HSSi's users, contributing to an average savings of over PhP 4,000 per customer per year. Additional working hours at night, provided by the solar light systems, contributed an additional PhP 17,000 in earnings per years on average. The report also notes significant increases in studying time, motivation, air quality, safety, and time savings after purchasing the HSSi solar light systems. After only two years at HSSi, Ayala received both the Ernst & Young Entrepreneur of the Year Award and the Ernst & Young Social Entrepreneur of the Year Award for the Philippines in 2012. Ayala currently serves as the CEO of HSSi.

Stiftung Solarenergie Philippines 
Ayala also founded Stiftung Solarenergie Philippines (StS), a Filipino foundation that is a founding member of Stiftung Solarenergie International Network for Rural Development, an international non-profit organization whose mission is to work for rural development and poverty alleviation by providing solar energy in rural and marginalized areas worldwide. As a part of their Light for Education and Light for Health programs, StS Philippines donates solar lights with charging capabilities to local schools and health clinics, rather than individual households. StS provides in-depth trainings and requires that the school or clinic complete weekly monitoring forms. In some cases, StS donates an original set of lights to an off-grid community and works with them to create a rental program, which allows the community to generate enough capital to purchase more lights and continue having access sustainably. Ayala currently serves as the Chairman of Stiftung Solarenergie Philippines.

Hystra, Inc. 
Ayala is also a network partner of Hystra, a global consulting firm that works alongside social entrepreneurs and large corporations. Hystra works to scale-up innovative ideas and models to help provide the poor with access to essential services such as water and sanitation.

Honors and awards 
In 2005, Ayala was a finalist for the CNBC Asia Business Leaders Award.

In 2012, Ayala received both the Ernst & Young Entrepreneur of the Year Award and Ernst & Young Social Entrepreneur of the Year Awards for his work with Hybrid Social Solutions, Inc.

In 2013, Ayala was named one of the Schwab Foundation's 24 World Social Entrepreneurs of the Year.

References 

 
 

1962 births
Living people
Harvard Business School alumni
People from Makati
Businesspeople from Metro Manila
Princeton University alumni
Filipino expatriates in the United States
Ayala Corporation people
Filipino chief executives